Carlisle Military School was established in 1892 at Bamberg, South Carolina, as The Carlisle Fitting School of Wofford College and closed in 1977.  This school was named in honor of Dr. James H. Carlisle, who was the president of Wofford College in Spartanburg, South Carolina (1875–1902) and one of the most preeminent educators in the history of South Carolina.  Dr. Carlisle stated that "The student ought to be educated not simply or chiefly because he intends to become a farmer, lawyer, or statesman, but because he is a human being - with inlets of joy, with possibilities of effort and action that no trade or calling can satisfy or exhaust".

History

Carlisle Fitting School

The Carlisle Fitting School was authorized by the South Carolina Methodist Conference in 1892 as a preparatory school for Wofford College.  While the decision to open a second fitting school for Wofford (The Wofford Fitting School was opened in 1887 on the Wofford campus) was strongly promoted by Wofford's financial administrator John Carlisle Kilgo (who also laid the cornerstone of Carlisle's first building), Carlisle was largely a town of Bamberg enterprise and gifts for its financial support were largely local.  This was probably a chief reason why Carlisle enrolled girls as well as boys during this time.  As an added benefit, the Carlisle Fitting School also prepared students for entrance into Wofford's sophomore class.  But Carlisle was unfortunate in that its leadership changed so often – out of nine headmasters during its nearly forty years under the Methodist Church and Wofford College trustees, only John C. Guilds (for whom a building on the Carlisle campus was named, and who later became President of Columbia College (South Carolina)) served as headmaster longer than five years.  Guilds had gone to Carlisle as a teacher after his graduation from Wofford in 1906, and he was elected headmaster in 1910.  The Guilds' administration was a most successful one, as he had taken over the administration of a school which was at the point of failure with only 3 teachers and 60 students.  Under his eleven years as headmaster, he left Carlisle with 10 teachers and 225 students.  Also during his administration, and largely due to World War I, a Junior Reserve Officers' Training Corps (ROTC) program was formally established - setting the stage for what the future would hold for Carlisle.

However, in the next eight years there were three more headmasters: Duncan, Hagood, and Gault. And in 1928, as the need for fitting schools had passed (the Wofford Fitting School was closed in 1924), the Methodist Church decided that Carlisle would no longer be affiliated with Wofford College.

Carlisle School transition to Carlisle Military School
Along with this major shift in direction in 1928, Colonel James F. Risher (who had arrived at Carlisle in 1924, serving as a science teacher and quartermaster) was elected as headmaster.  Colonel Risher would prove to be the right man at the right time in Carlisle's history.  It was indeed a testament to Colonel Risher's (as well as his wife Emma's) faith in Carlisle that – even as the "Great Depression" was deepening – he leased Carlisle from the Methodist Church in 1932.  Then in 1938, as the Methodist Church was considering to close Carlisle entirely,  Colonel Risher - again taking a "leap of faith" – offered to purchase Carlisle from the Methodist Church, even while the entire nation was still in the grips of the Great Depression.  The future of Carlisle was secured when Colonel Risher's offer was accepted, and Carlisle School was thereafter known as Carlisle Military School.  Colonel Risher established his vision of "developing manly men" serving as headmaster of Carlisle until 1958, when his son (William R.) was named as his successor.  Another major event occurred in 1958 when Colonel Risher purchased Camden Academy (Camden, S.C.), naming another son, (Lanning P.), as the headmaster of what would henceforth be known as Camden Military Academy. Colonel Risher carried his "life's calling" forward as president of both institutions until his death in 1973.

Closure

In addition to the loss of Colonel Risher as its central guiding force for nearly half a century, Carlisle faced the effect of a dwindling enrollment in the post-Vietnam era of the 1970s and closed its doors at the end of the 1977 school year.
Since 1979 the property has been used as a U.S. Department of Labor Job Corps Training Center, continuing its relevance as an educational institution in the Bamberg community and beyond.

Heritage
However, the history of Carlisle did not die with its closure, because all the cadets who ever walked through her doors, as well as those from Camden Military Academy, carry with them the lasting heritage, and eternal values, this institution endowed on them.  From its foundation built upon the legacy of its namesake, James Henry Carlisle - who once replied to a group of Wofford students presenting him a gift on his birthday, that they simply remember him with the epitaph "He aways meant to do me good".  Through John Caldwell Guilds, who brought Carlisle back from the brink of closure and once succinctly stated his view that Carlisle "has always been run for the good it can do and never as a money-making enterprise".  And lastly, the "Old Colonel" who saw his life intertwined with Carlisle as a "calling", not unlike that of a minister.  On the grave marker for James Franklin Risher are written the sublime words that very likely describes the vision he had in mind for all his Carlisle boys to aspire to: "Here Lies A Man".

In a letter to his charges, Colonel Risher once wrote:

"Gentlemen,

Let me urge each of you to follow the simple Path of Duty.  It leads through valleys of disappointment, up hills of difficulty, through deserts of doubts and self-denial, and sometimes down into the darkness of an unknown tomb.  It does not end there, but leads into the glorious sunlight of an eternal Resurrection; to joy, and true success.

Faithfully yours,

James F. Risher,
Head Master"

Commemoration and Reunion
On April 14, 2018, a commemoration of Carlisle Military School's history was held in Bamberg, SC, on its former campus (now a Federal Department of Labor Job Corps Training Center). A commemorative plaque was dedicated that will be erected as part of the City and County of Bamberg Veterans Memorial Trail.  Additionally, the South Carolina House of Representatives passed a Resolution (H.5183) "To Honor The Significant History Of The Carlisle Military School In The Celebration Of The School's Rich Legacy With A Reunion On April 14, 2018".

Alumni

Notable alumni
 Van C. Doubleday, Major General, U.S. Air Force CMS 1947, USAF Air Traffic Control Award named for him
 Stanley Tuemler Escudero CMS 1960, U.S. Ambassador
 George B. Hartzog Jr. (1920–2008) CMS 1937, former Director of the National Park Service.
 Luther Conway Shelton III "Buddy", CMS 1961, attended the United States Air Force Academy, professional golfer/entertainer/inspirational speaker
 Fred Zeigler CMS 1965, University of South Carolina football player, S.C. Athletic Hall of Fame

Photo gallery

References

Further reading
 McGehee, Larry T., "Southern Seen - Meditations on Past and Present", University of Tennessee Press, Knoxville, TN, 2005 (pgs. 134-135)
 Thompson, Waddy (1988), At Ease, Book Service Associates, Winston-Salem, NC, p. 85
 Zemp, Lachicotte, Carlisle & Camden: A Centennial History of Carlisle Military School and Camden Military Academy, Midlands Printing Company, 1998 https://lookaside.fbsbx.com/file/CMS%20History.pdf?token=AWzhLNwjNJmkrU6o3eOOfAZwpdyufrJsVlunvVkhKEfXs1oM4-byuVep6odPlRqgH6KD_Sq6pJO5vGIReHupgGBPCXMSdWkp2-Pps6_c942rLa1uIKifgApGCGbGQy_0_H2jgsDYe4aFLjrrez4LM3Gzsth0Py--5y5_EPzyXRuZjA
 Wofford College 1915-16 Catalog, pp. 74–75, Carlisle Fitting School http://digitalcommons.wofford.edu/catalogues/50/
 Library of Congress (Digital Newspapers - Bamberg Herald) http://chroniclingamerica.loc.gov/search/pages/results/?date1=1906&date2=1921&sequence=0&lccn=sn86063790&state=South+Carolina&rows=20&ortext=&proxtext=&year=&phrasetext=&andtext=Guilds+Carlisle&proxValue=&dateFilterType=yearRange&page=18&sort=relevance
 Submarine Escaping Apparatus, July 16, 1929 https://www.google.com/patents/US1721039
 Risher, Col. James F., "Risher, Col. James F., December 8, 1947. ," Special Collections & Archives Research Center, http://scarc.library.oregonstate.edu/omeka/items/show/24716.
 "Shot Down By A Preacher", The Daily Mercury, May 6, 1900 http://www.newspaperabstracts.com/link.php?action=detail&id=132308
 "The Bamberg Killing - Rev. Johnson & Mr. Bellinger", The Watchman And Southron, May 16, 1900 http://www.newspaperabstracts.com/link.php?action=detail&id=110067
Boyanoski, John (2010), "High School Football In South Carolina: Palmetto Pigskin History", The History Press, Charleston, SC

External links
 Carlisle Alumni Group Facebook Page
 Wofford-affiliated fitting school evolved into Carlisle Military

Educational institutions established in 1892
Military high schools in the United States
Defunct schools in South Carolina
1892 establishments in South Carolina